Kim Reed Perell  is an American serial entrepreneur, business executive, speaker, author and startup mentor, based in Miami, Florida.
 
Perell has authored two books, The Execution Factor: The One Skill that Drives Success, and Jump: Dare To Do What Scares You In Business And In Life. She is Founder and CEO of 100.co, an AI-based online marketplace for brands and products development and marketing.

Early life 
Perell was born and raised in Portland, Oregon. She attended college at Pepperdine University, graduating magna cum laude with a Bachelor of Science in Business administration. In an interview on Fox Business News, Perell said the she follow in the path of her parents, who were both entrepreneurs, to take advantage of the digital economy and the Internet to launch her career.

Career 
Perell is best known as the former chief executive officer of Amobee, a subsidiary of Singtel. She is also known for her work at Xdrive, a tech startup.
 
At the age of 22, Perell joined Xdrive Technology. Promoted to Director of Marketing and Sales. during her first year, Perell recruited 10 million users to the company's services and generated over $9 million in advertising.
 
Perell later founded Frontline Direct in 2003 focused on marketing. Frontline Direct reached $3.5 million in revenue in 2005 and more than $100 million by 2010. The company's client base grew from 63 customers to 380 while personnel grew from five employees to 74. Perell sold Frontline to Adconion Media Group, after which the two merged to form Adconion Direct located in Santa Monica, California.
Perell remained as CEO after the merger, and became the first woman appointed to the board. In 2014, Adconion Direct was bought by Amobee, a subsidiary of Singtel, an Asian telecommunications company, for $235 million. Perell was named President of Amobee and later promoted to CEO in December 2016.
 
Perell then led the acquisition of Turn, a data management company, in February 2017.
 
Perell stepped down as CEO of Amobee in December 2019 to pursue her passion of supporting startup entrepreneurs.
 
Perell is also a startup mentor for women entrepreneurs in the San Diego area.

100.co
In 2021, Kim Perell founded 100.co, a digital technology company for brands and products development. Perell relocated from San Diego to Miami, where the company has its current headquarters. According to a number of sources, the company leverages artificial intelligence "to analyze trends and develop brands around consumer preferences", in particular, by using CLAIRE intelligence platform. The company specializes in Consumer packaged goods companies and involves influencers.

In May 2021, the company acquired Cherry Pick AI, a New York-based predictive intelligence platform for product development. In June 2021, the company bought AI.PARC startup and acquired its Artificial Intelligence (AI), Machine Learning (ML) and Natural Language Processing (NLP) patents to upgrade its database tools.

Author 
Perell's book, The Execution Factor: The One Skill that Drives Success, was a USA Today National Best-Selling Book. It debuted at No. 2 on the LA Times' bestseller list.
 by McGraw Hill Professional
 by HarperCollins

Investments 
Perell is an active angel investor, contributing to more than 60 startups, of which more than a 10 were acquired for over $500 million in value.

Personal life

Awards and nominations 
 San Diego Metro's 40 Under 40 Awards – 2014
 2015 Best in Biz Awards: Bronze – Executive of the Year, Medium
 2015 American Business Awards: Gold – Woman of the Year
 Business Insider Singapore's 30 Most Powerful Women in Mobile Advertising – 2015
 Business Insider's 30 Most Powerful Women in Mobile Advertising – 2016
 2016 American Business Awards: Silver – Executive of the Year – Advertising, Marketing & Public Relations
 2016 Best in Biz Awards: Silver – Entrepreneur/Founder of the Year
 2016 American Business Awards: Silver – Woman of the Year
 San Diego Metro's 40 Under 40 Awards – 2016
 2017 American Business Awards – Woman of the Year
 AdAge's 25 Marketing Technology Trailblazers – 2017
 San Diego Magazine's 20 San Diego Women to Celebrate – 2017
 The Hustle's 2X Woman of the Year – 2018
 2018 John C. Maxwell Top 30 Top Transformational Leaders Award
 2018 Women World Awards: Gold – Female Entrepreneur of the Year

Extra links
 100.co

References 

 

Year of birth missing (living people)
Living people
Businesspeople from Portland, Oregon
American women chief executives
American technology chief executives
Pepperdine University alumni
21st-century American women writers
Writers from Portland, Oregon